Kentucky Proud Park is a baseball stadium in Lexington, Kentucky. It is the home field of the University of Kentucky Wildcats college baseball team. Opened in 2018, with the Wildcats playing their first season in the stadium in 2019, it has a permanent capacity of 2,500, with grass berm seating adding more than 1,500 to the total capacity. Temporary seating can be added to bring the capacity to 7,000 for NCAA tournament games.

The replacement for Cliff Hagan Stadium, the park received its name in a deal between JMI Sports, which holds the multimedia rights for UK sports and also markets the naming rights to all Wildcats venues, and the Kentucky Farm Bureau, an organization promoting the interests of Kentucky farmers which is best known by the non-farming public for its insurance business. The Farm Bureau chose to donate its naming rights to the Kentucky Department of Agriculture, which uses "Kentucky Proud" as the brand for its marketing program for agricultural products made in the state.

Kentucky opened up Kentucky Proud Park on February 26, 2019, with a 7–3 win over Eastern Kentucky in front of 4,074 fans.

Kentucky Proud Park in Detail 
The Kentucky Proud Park features a large entrance right being home plate and a left field entrance directly connected to the parking lot. There is also an interactive screen at the entrance that allows fans to touch to see the history of the team, the information about the stadium, the players who played in the major leagues, and design their own uniform with the Kentucky colors. The large concourse wraps around the entire field and is spacious with dealerships, bathrooms and other signs. Club and lounge areas are also available to fans.  A small grass area in left field is accessible for kids to get entertained during the game. The Kentucky Proud Park include a big video board. Measured at 48 feet wide and 30 feet tall, the video board is the eight largest video board in all College Baseball.

First Reaction 
A couple days before the 2019 opening season, Nick Mingione, head coach of the Kentucky Wildcats Baseball team, was interviewed concerning the new Kentucky Proud Park. “It really is just a special place,” was his original reaction. “I’m excited for the Big Blue Nation to experience it. I think they’re really going to fall in love with it,” Head Coach Mingione said. “The team has really fit in here,”  “They’re comfortable here. T.J. Collett already hit the first Big Blue Bomb here. We won the first one... this is our true home. We’re excited to stay and finish the season strong here,” Mingione said on February 26, 2019, after a 7-3 win.

2016-2017 season 
The last time the Wildcats made a postseason run was in 2016. They ended up hosting a regional tournament in Lexington. The Cliff Hagan Stadium saw its first postseason action since 2006. Nick Mingione led his troops to this postseason run in his first year. After beating Ohio University, Indiana University and North Carolina State University twice in Lexington during the regionals, the Wildcats moved on to the Super Regionals. They faced the Louisville Cardinals. The Wildcats saw their season end after two consecutive lost to Louisville who advanced to the College World Series.

Kentucky Wildcats' Record in Kentucky Proud Park in (2019-Present)

See also 
 List of NCAA Division I baseball venues
 Climate Pledge Arena, an indoor arena in Seattle that received its current name via a similar donation of naming rights
 Friends Arena, a stadium in Stockholm that received its current name via a similar donation of naming rights

References

External links
Kentucky Proud Park at UKAthletics.com
Kentucky Proud Park at StadiumJourney.com
BASE: New Stadium Facilities Tour at Youtube.com 
University of Kentucky Proud Park Construction Time-Lapse  at Youtube.com
BASE: Kentucky Proud Park Opening Day Recap  at Youtube.com

Kentucky Wildcats baseball
Sports venues in Lexington, Kentucky
Buildings at the University of Kentucky
Baseball venues in Kentucky
2018 establishments in Kentucky
Sports venues completed in 2018